Paul Crowley may refer to:

 Paul Crowley (footballer) (born 1980), Irish footballer
 Paul Crowley (ice hockey) (born 1955), Canadian ice hockey player
 Paul F. Crowley (born 1934), member of the Pennsylvania House of Representatives